Cymmer Afan railway station served the village of Cymmer, in the historical county of Glamorganshire, Wales, from 1885 to 1970 on the Rhondda and Swansea Bay Railway.

History 
The station was opened as Cymmer on 2 November 1885 by the Rhondda and Swansea Bay Railway. It was a temporary station, being replaced in 1888 by a station of the same name. It amalgamated with the nearby Cymmer General railway station in January 1950. The station closed to passengers on 22 June 1970 but it was later used by schools until 14 July 1970.

References

External links 

Disused railway stations in Neath Port Talbot
Railway stations in Great Britain opened in 1885
Railway stations in Great Britain closed in 1970
1885 establishments in Wales
1970 disestablishments in Wales
Beeching closures in Wales